Aristotle of Argos (or Aristoteles, ; fl. 3rd century BC), was a political leader in Argos and a friend of Aratus of Sicyon. In 224 BC he belonged to the party at Argos which was hostile to the Spartan king Cleomenes III. After Cleomenes had taken possession of the city, Aristoteles attacked the Spartan garrison to lead his city again into the Achaean League.

Some historians think that he has to be identified with Aristotle, the dialectician, a philosopher who in 252 contrived and successfully executed a plot to kill Abantidas, the tyrant of Sicyon. Because the philosopher would have been quite old at that time it appears more probable that he was a son or a relative of the Dialectic.

Notes

References

3rd-century BC Greek people
Ancient Argives
Achaean League
Year of birth unknown
Year of death unknown